Limarí may refer to:

 Limarí Province, one of three provinces of the Chilean region of Coquimbo Region
 Limarí River, a river of Chile located in the Coquimbo Region